The 1875 FA Cup final was a football match between Royal Engineers and Old Etonians on 13 March 1875 at Kennington Oval in London. It was the fourth final of the world's oldest football competition, the Football Association Challenge Cup (known in the modern era as the FA Cup). Heading into the final, the Royal Engineers were playing in their third final after losing the 1872 and 1874 finals while the Old Etonians were playing in their first FA Cup final.

Prior to the final, the Royal Engineers had played one more match than the Old Etonians with the Etonians getting a bye in the second round due to the odd number of the teams that had entered the tournament. 2,000 people saw the match which ended in a 1–1 draw, Henry Renny-Tailyour scored for the Engineers but Alexander Bonsor replied to have the match end in a draw and have the final being replayed for the first time with two goals from Renny-Tailyour sealing the Royal Engineers' first and only FA Cup title.

Route to the final

The Engineers, who lost the final on two of the three previous occasions, kicked off with a resounding 3–0 win over Marlow. They kept the scoring feat up in the next round, beating Cambridge University 5–0. The Quarter Final was a closely fought match against Clapham Rovers, just prevailing 3–2. The Semi-final produced a repeat fixture of the final of 1874, as the Engineers faced Oxford University. This time, the Engineers won 1–0.

The Old Etonians started off against the Swifts, which proved a very tough match. After two drawn games, the Etonians managed to pull off a 3–0 victory. In the second round they received a bye which led them into the quarter-finals. Following a win against Maidenhead, they played Shropshire Wanderers. An extremely close match was just edged out by a single goal to nil.

Final matches
The first match was notable chiefly because it was played in a "howling gale". The conditions considerably favoured the Etonians team, which had the wind at its backs for all but 10 minutes of the 90, and all 30 minutes of extra time (teams in this period changed ends after every goal- this game was the last to feature this rule). Cuthbert Ottaway received an ankle injury after 37 minutes into the final, following a collision with Richard Ruck, and was forced to leave the field; in his absence, the Old Boys were regarded as fortunate to have held on for a 1–1 draw.

Ottaway failed to recover in time for the replay, held only three days later, and Etonians also lost the services of three other players who had prior commitments. Unable to obtain adequate replacements, the Old Boys arrived at the ground an hour late and lost the delayed replay 0–2. Henry Renny-Tailyour scored all three goals in both matches for the Engineers.

The newspaper The Observer published the following chronicle of the match on 14 March 1875:

Final

Replay

Notes
Several modern sources claim that Stafford scored the second goal in the replay, but no contemporaneous reports support this, most of which report that the ball crossed the line in a goalmouth scramble. In an amendment to his obituary in the Royal Engineers' Journal published in February 1922, the biographer credits Renny-Tailyour with both goals in the replay.

References

Bibliography

1875
FA
1875 sports events in London
March 1875 sports events